Spring Creek is a stream in Macon County, Illinois.  A tributary of Stevens Creek, itself a tributary of the Sangamon River, Spring Creek originates just northeast of the town of Forsyth before emptying into Stevens Creek west of Horace B. Garman Park in Decatur, Illinois.

References 

Rivers of Illinois
Rivers of Macon County, Illinois